Sungai Durian, or "Durian River", is a village in the district of IX Koto Sungai Lasi, Solok Regency in the province of West Sumatra, Indonesia.
The village had 662 inhabitants as of the 2010 census.

Events

A barefoot futsal tournament was held in the village in July 2015 between KKN students and local youth, the Sungai Durian Cup.
At one point play was almost interrupted by a wandering buffalo.
In July 2016, towards the end of Ramadan, a dispute broke out between villagers of Sungai Durian and the neighboring village of Bukit Bais.
Police intervened and managed to prevent violence.

Police would not confirm that the pool was an excavated mine, and said that if it was a mine they did not know when the mining was done.
The mine would be illegal under the constitution, but presumably its presence was known by the local people and the police.

Notes

Sources

Populated places in West Sumatra